Ray, Goodman & Brown is the eponymous studio album by American R&B/soul vocal trio Ray, Goodman & Brown, released in 1979 through Polydor Records. Recording sessions took place at H & L Sound Studios in Englewood Cliffs, New Jersey with record producer Vincent Castellano. The album peaked at number 17 on the Billboard Top LPs & Tape chart and number 2 on the Soul LPs chart in the United States, and was certified gold by the Recording Industry Association of America on April 2, 1980. It spawned the hit singles: "Special Lady" and "Inside of You", which charted on the Billboard Hot 100 singles chart at No. 5 and No. 76, respectively. Its lead single, "Special Lady", became number-one R&B single in the U.S. and was certified gold by the RIAA on May 13, 1980.

Track listing

Personnel 
 Harry Milton Ray – vocals
 Willie Albert "Al" Goodman – vocals
 William Anthony "Billy" Brown – vocals
 Vincent Castellano – producer, executive producer
 Barbara Baker – executive producer
 Stephen A. Jeromos – engineering
 Gregory Calbi – mastering
 Stephanie Cataliotti – coordinator
 Robert L. Heimall – art direction
 Stephanie Zuras – design
 John Paul "Bud" Endress – photography

Charts

Weekly charts

Year-end charts

Certifications

References

External links 
 

1979 albums
Polydor Records albums
Soul albums by American artists